Michael Smith (26 January 1958) is an English professional rugby league footballer who played in the 1970s, 1980s, and 1990s.

Background
Mike Smith has worked as a rigger.

Playing career

Honours

Great Britain Lions Tourist - 1979, 1984

Challenge Cup Winner - 1979/80 (R/Up - 1980/81, 1985/86)

Rugby League Championship Winner - 1978/79, 1983/84, 1984/85 (R/Up - 1982/83)

John Player Trophy Winner - 1984/85 (R/Up 1981/82, 1985/86)

Rugby League Premiership Trophy - 1980/81, 1983/84 (R/Up - 1984/85)

BBC2 Trophy - 1977/78 (R/Up - 1979/80)

Yorkshire Cup - 1985/86 (R/Up- 1980/81, 1984/85)

Charity Shield - R/Up 1985

Division Two Championship - 1989/90

Hull KR Player of The Year-  1981/82

Hull KR Record Appearance Holder 1974 -1991 (Heritage No 779)

International honours
Mike Smith won caps for England while at Hull Kingston Rovers in 1980 against Wales, and France, in 1981 against France, and Wales (2 matches), and won caps for Great Britain while at Hull Kingston Rovers in 1979 against New Zealand (3 matches & 2 Tries), in 1980 against New Zealand (2 matches & 1 Try), in 1981 against France (2 matches), in 1982 against Australia (2 matches), and in 1984 against France (sub), and New Zealand.

In addition to the above Test matches, Mike Smith played left-, i.e. number 4, in Great Britain's 7–8 defeat by France in the friendly at Stadio Pier Luigi Penzo, Venice on Saturday 31 July 1982.

Mike Smith was selected to take part in the Great Britain Tours of Australia, New Zealand & PNG in 1979 and 1984

County Honours

Mike Smith represented Yorkshire against Lancashire in 1978.

1983 Queensland Tour

Mike Smith played right-, i.e. number 3, and scored the match winning try in Hull Kingston Rovers' 8–6 victory over Queensland  as they toured Papua New Guinea and England part of the 1983–84 Rugby Football League season

Challenge Cup Final appearances
Mike Smith played right-, i.e. number 3, in Hull Kingston Rovers' 10–5 victory over Hull F.C. in the 1979–80 Challenge Cup Final during the 1979–80 season at Wembley Stadium, London on Saturday 3 May 1980, in front of a crowd of 95,000, and played right-, i.e. number 3, in the 9–18 defeat by Widnes in the 1980–81 Challenge Cup Final during the 1980–81 season at Wembley Stadium, London on Saturday 2 May 1981, in front of a crowd of 92,496, and played right-, i.e. number 3, in the 14–15 defeat by Castleford in the 1985-86 Challenge Cup Final during the 1985-86 season at Wembley Stadium, London, on Saturday 3 May 1986, in front of a crowd of 82,134.

County Cup Final appearances
Mike Smith played right-, i.e. number 3, in Hull Kingston Rovers' 7–8 defeat by Leeds in the 1980–81 Yorkshire County Cup Final during the 1980–81 season at Fartown Ground, Huddersfield on Saturday 8 November 1980, and played  in the 12–29 defeat by Hull F.C. in the 1984–85 Yorkshire County Cup Final during the 1984–85 season at Boothferry Park, Kingston upon Hull on Saturday 27 October 1984.

BBC2 Floodlit Trophy Final appearances
Mike Smith played right-, i.e. number 3, and scored a try in Hull Kingston Rovers' 26–11 victory over St. Helens in the 1977 BBC2 Floodlit Trophy Final during the 1977–78 season at Craven Park, Hull on Tuesday 13 December 1977, and played right-, i.e. number 3, in the 3–13 defeat by Hull F.C. in the 1979 BBC2 Floodlit Trophy Final during the 1979–80 season at The Boulevard, Hull on Tuesday 18 December 1979.

John Player/John Player Special Trophy Final appearances
Mike Smith played right-, i.e. number 3, in Hull Kingston Rovers' 4–12 defeat by Hull F.C. in the 1981–82 John Player Trophy Final during the 1981–82 season at Headingley Rugby Stadium, Leeds on Saturday 23 January 1982, played  in the 12–0 victory over Hull F.C. in the 1984–85 John Player Special Trophy Final during the 1984–85 season at Boothferry Park, Kingston upon Hull on Saturday 26 January 1985, and played right-, i.e. number 3, in the 8–11 defeat by Wigan in the 1985–86 John Player Special Trophy Final during the 1985–86 season at Elland Road, Leeds on Saturday 11 January 1986.

Rugby League Premiership Final
Mike Smith played right-, i.e. number 3, and scored a try in Hull Kingston Rovers' 11–7 victory over Hull F.C. in the Final of the 1980-81 Rugby League Premiership during the 1980–81 season

Mike Smith played right-, i.e. number 3, and scored a try in Hull Kingston Rovers' 18–10 victory over Castleford Tigers in the Final of the 1983-84 Rugby League Premiership during the 1983–84 season

Mike Smith played number 6, in Hull Kingston Rovers' 36–16 defeat against St.Helens in the Final of the 1984-85 Rugby League Premiership during the 1984-85 season

Testimonial match
Mike Smith's Testimonial match at Hull Kingston Rovers took place in 1986.

Club career
Smith spent the vast majority of his professional career with Hull Kingston Rovers, he is the club's appearance record holder, having played 489 games between 1974 and 1991.

References

External links
 (archived by web.archive.org) Hull Kingston Rovers ~ Captains

1958 births
Living people
England national rugby league team players
English rugby league players
Great Britain national rugby league team players
Hull Kingston Rovers players
Rugby league players from Kingston upon Hull
Rugby league centres
Rugby league five-eighths